Sasu station is a railway station in Yangji-rodongjagu, Changjin County, South Hamgyŏng province, North Korea, the northern terminus of the Changjin Line of the Korean State Railway.

History 
The station was opened on 1 November 1934 by the Sinhŭng Railway as part of the second section of its Changjin Line between Samgŏ and Kujin. Sasu became the terminus of the line after the closure of the Sindae–Kujin and Sasu–Sindae sections on 15 July and 30 August 1935 respectively. The Sinhŭng Railway was bought and absorbed by the Chosen Railway on 22 April 1938.

References

Railway stations in North Korea